The Charles Gaylord House, located in Corvallis, Oregon, is a house that is listed on the National Register of Historic Places.

See also
 National Register of Historic Places listings in Benton County, Oregon

References

1857 establishments in Oregon Territory
Gothic Revival architecture in Oregon
Houses completed in 1857
Houses in Corvallis, Oregon
Houses on the National Register of Historic Places in Oregon
National Register of Historic Places in Benton County, Oregon